Everett Olive Hales (27 October 1876 – 1 November 1947) was a New Zealand cricketer who played first-class cricket for Wellington between 1896 and 1910. He was later a senior public servant.

Life and career
Everett Hales was educated at Wellington College, Wellington, and joined the Public Trustee Office in Wellington in 1894. In 1921 he became Assistant Public Trustee. In 1934 he was appointed Public Trustee.

Hales was a fast-medium left-arm bowler who took a long run-up and was notable for the swing he achieved in his deliveries. He took 5 for 41 and 1 for 16 when Wellington gained their first away victory against Canterbury in Christchurch in January 1901. His best figures were 6 for 22 and 3 for 20 in Wellington's victory over Hawke's Bay in December the same year.

He also represented Wellington at rugby union, and was later chairman of Wellington Rugby Union.

References

External links

Everett Hales at CricketArchive

1876 births
1947 deaths
People educated at Wellington College (New Zealand)
New Zealand cricketers
Wellington cricketers
Wellington rugby union players
Cricketers from Wellington City
North Island cricketers
20th-century New Zealand public servants